"Learnin' the Blues" is a big band popular song written by Dolores "Vicki" Silvers.  The song was originally recorded by Philadelphia singer Joe Valino, along with the Gene Kutch Orchestra.

Frank Sinatra versions
In 1955, "Learnin' the Blues" was recorded by Frank Sinatra with Nelson Riddle & his Orchestra. Initially published on the B side of the EP Session With Sinatra (Capitol Records EAP 1-629), Learnin' the Blues was subsequently re-released in June 1955 as a single with Sinatra's If I Had Three Wishes on the B side (Capitol 3102).

In 1962, Frank Sinatra recorded a longer version in collaboration with Count Basie & his orchestra for the Sinatra–Basie: An Historic Musical First album.

Chart performance
In the weeks of 3-9 and 24–30 July 1955, Sinatra's rendition was briefly the most frequently played song on U.S. radio. The single's sales peaked at #2 on the NME British charts in August 1955, and at #1 on the Australian charts for the week of 13–19 November 1955. In cumulative year-end charts for 1955, Learnin' the Blues ranked #14 (Billboard Year-End) in the United States and #17 (NME Year-End) in the United Kingdom. Sinatra re-recorded the song in 1962 for the album Sinatra-Basie.

Sources

Frank Sinatra songs
1955 singles